The 1987 Boston College Eagles football team represented Boston College as an independent during the 1987 NCAA Division I-A football season. The Eagles were led by seventh-year head coach Jack Bicknell, and played their home games at Alumni Stadium in Chestnut Hill, Massachusetts. They also played an alternate-site home game at Sullivan Stadium (later known as Foxboro Stadium) in Foxborough, Massachusetts.

Schedule

Roster

References

Boston College
Boston College Eagles football seasons
Boston College Eagles football
Boston College Eagles football